Salana multivorans is a Gram-positive and facultatively anaerobic species of bacteria that has been isolated from sediments from the river Saale in Germany.

References

Micrococcales
Bacteria described in 2001
Monotypic bacteria genera